Tabanović may refer to the following villages in Serbia:
 Tabanović (Mionica), in Kolubara District
 Tabanović (Šabac), in Mačva District